Palaver sauce or palava sauce or plasas is a type of stew widely eaten in West Africa, including Ghana, Liberia, Sierra Leone and Nigeria. The word palaver comes from the Portuguese language and means a talk, lengthy debate or quarrel. It is unclear how this led to the name of the stew. One theory is that the spices used in the stew mingle together like raised voices in an argument. It has been thought of as having the power to calm tensions, or to cause them. Other names for the dish include kontonmire, kentumere, nkontommire and pla'sas.

It has regional variations and can contain beef, fish, shrimp, pepitas, cassava, taro (cocoyam) leaves, and palm oil. It is served with boiled rice, potatoes, garri, fufu or yams. Outside of Africa, spinach is often used as a substitute for other greens. The leaves used to make this soup in Liberia are called molokhia or mulukhiyah leaves.

Recipe
The meat is first cut into small pieces and is fried in palm oil in a pan, and to the pan is added onion, pepper and chilli. Next is added the fish, dried or smoked, previously moistened and cut in chunks. The vegetables are sliced and incorporated into the cooking pan (spinach leaves or bean leaves, cabbage, kale, okra), and finally water is poured to help in the cooking and spices for seasoning. The mixture is kept on a low fire until all the ingredients are cooked and the water has reduced. It is served with white rice.

See also

African cuisine
 List of stews

References

Stews
Ghanaian cuisine
Liberian cuisine
Sierra Leonean cuisine
Nigerian cuisine
Spinach dishes